The 2011 Superstars Series Misano-1 round was the fourth round of the 2011 Superstars Series season. It took place on 5 June at the Misano World Circuit.

Luigi Ferrara won the first race, starting from third position, and Massimo Pigoli won the second one, both driving a Mercedes C63 AMG.

Classification

Qualifying

Race 1

Race 2

Standings after the event
Italian Championship standings

 Note: Only the top five positions are included for both sets of drivers' standings.

References

2011 in Italian motorsport
Superstars Series seasons